Rabot  is a village located in the Pulatan Jamoat of the city of Konibodom, in the Sughd Region, of Tajikistan. Its population was 2786 people in (2017).

References

Populated places in Sughd Region